Mamaroš is a 2013 Serbian comedy film written and directed by Momčilo Mrdaković. It competed in the main competition section of the 35th Moscow International Film Festival.

Cast
 Sergej Trifunović as Policajac
 Erin O'Brien as Concession Girl
 Bogdan Diklić as Pera Ilic
 Mira Banjac as Mara
 Milos Samolov as Mika
 Milan Marić as Decak vojnik
 Vlasta Velisavljevic as Penzioner / Tajni agent
 Goran Radaković as Staklorezac Sima
 Anita Mančić as Lela
 Adam Kern as Immigration Officer

References

External links
 

2013 films
2013 comedy films
2013 directorial debut films
Serbian comedy films
2010s Serbian-language films
Films set in Serbia
Films set in Belgrade
Films shot in Belgrade